Lars Ivarsson (born 22 May 1939) is a Swedish sports shooter. He competed in the mixed 50 metre running target event at the 1980 Summer Olympics.

References

External links
 

1939 births
Living people
Swedish male sport shooters
Olympic shooters of Sweden
Shooters at the 1980 Summer Olympics
People from Hallsberg Municipality
Sportspeople from Örebro County